Trumpler or Trümpler may refer to:

Surname 
Hans-Konrad Trümpler (born 1960), Swiss rower
Robert Julius Trumpler (1886–1956), Swiss-American astronomer

Astronomy 
Trumpler (lunar crater), a lunar impact crater
Trumpler (Martian crater), a crater in the Phaethontis quadrangle of Mars
 Trumpler classification